Harrogate Town Association Football Club is a professional association football club based in the spa town of Harrogate, North Yorkshire, England. The club competes in League Two, the fourth tier of English football, after winning the 2019–20 National League play-offs. The club is nicknamed "Town" and also the "Sulphurites", due to Harrogate's famous sulphur springs. The club's colours are black and yellow and they play their home games at Wetherby Road, though for a short period at the start of the 2020–21 season, the club shared Doncaster Rovers' Keepmoat Stadium while a new pitch was laid.

Harrogate Hotspurs were founded in 1935 and changed their name to Harrogate Town after football returned at the end of World War II, joining the West Yorkshire Association League. They entered the Yorkshire League again in 1957, before becoming founder members of the Northern Counties East League in 1982 and a founding member of the Northern Premier League's First Division in 1987. They won the Northern Premier League Division One title in 2001–02 and became founder members of the Conference North in 2004. They won the National League North play-offs in 2018 and then secured a place in the Football League for the first time with victory in the 2020 National League play-off final.

Key

Key to league record:
P – Played
W – Games won
D – Games drawn
L – Games lost
F – Goals for
A – Goals against
Pts – Points
Pos – Final position

Key to rounds:
Prelim – Preliminary round
QR1 – First qualifying round
QR2 – Second qualifying round, etc.
R1 – First round
R2 – Second round, etc.
QF – Quarter-final
SF – Semi-final
F – Final
W – Winners

Seasons

Notes

References

External links

 
Harrogate Town A.F.C.